Unstoppable global warming may refer to:

Runaway climate change
Unstoppable Global Warming, book by Fred Singer and Dennis T. Avery